is a former Japanese football player and manager.

Playing career
Yamamura was born in Handa on August 18, 1976. After graduating from Aichi Gakuin University, he joined newly was promoted to J2 League club, Ventforet Kofu in 1999. However he could hardly play in the match. In 2000, he moved to newly was promoted to J2 League club, Mito HollyHock. He became as regular player and played many matches as defensive midfielder and right side back. In 2001, he moved to Prefectural Leagues club Gunma FC Horikoshi. He played many matches and the club was promoted to Regional Leagues. In 2003, he moved to Regional Leagues club Okinawa Kariyushi FC and played many matches in 2 seasons. In November 2004, he moved to Japan Football League (JFL) club Gainare Tottori and played many matches until 2007. In 2008, he moved to Prefectural Leagues club SC Tottori Dreams and played in 2 seasons. In 2010, he moved to Regional Leagues club Maruyasu Industries (later Maruyasu Okazaki). He played many matches and the club was promoted to JFL from 2014. He retired end of 2016 season.

Coaching career
In 2014, when Yamamura played for Japan Football League club Maruyasu Okazaki, he became a playing manager. he managed the club until 2016.

Club statistics

References

External links

1976 births
Living people
People from Handa, Aichi
Aichi Gakuin University alumni
Association football people from Aichi Prefecture
Japanese footballers
J2 League players
Japan Football League players
Ventforet Kofu players
Mito HollyHock players
Arte Takasaki players
Gainare Tottori players
FC Maruyasu Okazaki players
Association football defenders